Chesterfield is a constituency represented in the House of Commons of the UK Parliament since 2010 by Toby Perkins of the Labour Party.

Constituency profile
The seat covers Chesterfield itself and the villages to the east. 59% of residents voted to leave the EU in 2016. Residents are slightly less healthy and wealthy than the UK average.

Boundaries 

The current boundaries include the town of Chesterfield, together with areas to the north towards Dronfield and to the east towards Bolsover, comprising the Borough of Chesterfield wards: Brimington North, Brimington South, Brockwell, Dunston, Hasland, Hollingwood and Inkersall, Holmebrook, Linacre, Loundsley Green, Middlecroft and Poolsbrook, Moor, Old Whittington, Rother, St Helen's, St Leonard's, Walton, and West. The other two Borough of Chesterfield wards (Barrow Hill and New Whittington; Lowgates and Woodthorpe) fall within the neighbouring North East Derbyshire seat. Boundary changes before the 2010 general election, when the Mid Derbyshire constituency was created, meant that Chesterfield lost New Whittington to North East Derbyshire but otherwise retained its shape.

History 
Chesterfield has mainly been a Labour seat, with periods when it has been held by other parties; it was gained by the Liberal Democrats in 2001 and held by them until 2010. Chesterfield was safe seat for Labour from 1935 until 2001. Andrew Cavendish, later the Duke of Devonshire, was the National Liberal candidate at the 1945 and 1950 elections.

The seat was held in succession by two prominent Labour politicians for over 35 years. The former Labour cabinet minister Eric Varley held the seat from October 1964 to January 1984, and was succeeded by his ex-government colleague Tony Benn, who held the seat following a by-election in March 1984. He remained the town's MP until his retirement from the House of Commons in 2001, when he famously remarked that his decision was taken to "spend more time on politics". Benn had been a Labour Cabinet Minister between 1966–70 and 1974–1979, while Varley was in the Wilson and Callaghan cabinets in the latter period. Paul Holmes gained the seat for the Liberal Democrats at the 2001 general election, the party's first Commons seat in the East Midlands, but were narrowly defeated at the 2010 by the Labour candidate Toby Perkins, one of only three seats the Labour Party gained at the 2010 general election. In 2015, a collapse in the Liberal Democrat vote nationwide had them fall behind to fourth place, the Conservatives move into second place, and Labour having their largest majority in the seat since 1979.

Members of Parliament

Election results

Elections in the 2010s

At the 2015 general election, this seat was the 25th most marginal constituency in Great Britain, the Liberal Democrats requiring a swing from Labour of 0.6% to take the seat (based on the result of the 2010 general election).

Elections in the 2000s

Elections in the 1990s

Elections in the 1980s

Elections in the 1970s

Elections in the 1960s

Elections in the 1950s

Elections in the 1940s

General Election 1939–40:

Another general election was required to take place before the end of 1940. The political parties had been making preparations for an election to take place from 1939 and by the end of this year, the following candidates had been selected; *Labour: George Benson, 
Conservative:

Elections in the 1930s

Elections in the 1920s

Elections in the 1910s

Elections in the 1900s

Elections in the 1890s

Elections in the 1880s

See also 
 1913 Chesterfield by-election
 List of parliamentary constituencies in Derbyshire

Notes

References
Specific

General
Craig, F. W. S. (1983). British parliamentary election results 1918-1949 (3 ed.). Chichester: Parliamentary Research Services. .
Guardian Unlimited Politics (Election results from 1992 to the present)
http://www.psr.keele.ac.uk/  (Election results from 1951 to the present)

External links 
nomis Constituency Profile for Chesterfield — presenting data from the ONS annual population survey and other official statistics.

Parliamentary constituencies in Derbyshire
Constituencies of the Parliament of the United Kingdom established in 1885
Chesterfield, Derbyshire